Mieczysław Rutyna (born 29 May 1931) is a Polish racewalker. He competed in the 20 and 50 kilometres walking events at the 1964 Summer Olympics and the 1968 Summer Olympics.

References

1931 births
Living people
Athletes (track and field) at the 1964 Summer Olympics
Athletes (track and field) at the 1968 Summer Olympics
Polish male racewalkers
Olympic athletes of Poland
Place of birth missing (living people)